The University of Florida Latin American & Caribbean Collections are a library within the George A. Smathers Libraries is "one of the leading research collections of its kind". Founded in 1951 to support scholarly interest in Latin America and the Caribbean, now the Latin American and Caribbean Collections are one of the University of Florida’s preeminent collections, holding approximately 500,000 volumes, over 50,000 microforms, thousands of current and historical serial titles, and a large number of digital resources. The Collections were also part of the Farmington Plan.

See also
 University of Florida Center for Latin American Studies
 Digital Library of the Caribbean

References

External links
 Latin American & Caribbean Collections
 Archival Finding Guides for collections in the Latin American & Caribbean Collections
 George A. Smathers Libraries
 Link to all of UF's libraries
 University of Florida Digital Collections (UFDC)

University and college academic libraries in the United States